Reas Run is a stream in the U.S. state of Ohio. It is a tributary to the Ohio River.

A variant name is "Rea's Run". Reas Run was named after William Rea, a pioneer settler.

References

Rivers of Ohio
Rivers of Washington County, Ohio